"The 10th Air Division assumed responsibility for the air defense of Alaska south of the Alaskan Range on 1 November 1950. Subordinate units flew numerous interception and training missions. Between June 1957 and March 1960, the division operated and maintained Elmendorf AFB, Alaska, plus several smaller installations. It was replaced by the 5070th Air Defense Wing (for air defense), and the 5040th Air Base Wing (for base operations) in August 1960."

Lineage 
 Established as the 10 Air Division (Defense) on 24 October 1950
 Organized on 1 November 1950
 Discontinued on 27 April 1951
 Activated on 27 April 1951
 Inactivated on 20 July 1951
 Activated on 1 November 1952
 Discontinued and inactivated on 25 August 1960

Emblem
Per saltire, sable, gules, vert and or, saltire argent between in chief a jet aircraft in flight above two mountain peaks all of the last, in the flanks an anti aircraft gun and a radar antenna directed outward all of the first fimbriated silver, in base five electric flashes issuing from the apex of radio tower all black.

Assignments
 Alaskan Air Command, 1 November 1950 – 27 April 1951
 Alaskan Air Command, 27 April 1951 – 20 July 1951
 Alaskan Air Command, 1 November 1952 – 25 August 1960

Components

Wing
 5040 Air Base Wing: 1 June 57 - 25 August 1960

Groups
 57th Fighter-Interceptor Group: attached c. 10 December 1950 – 27 April 1951 and 27 April 1951 – 20 July 1951; assigned 1 November 1952 – 13 April 1953
 531st Aircraft Control and Warning Group: 17 November 1950 - 20 July 1951; 1 November 1952 - 13 April 1953
 5039th Aircraft Control and Warning Group (later 5040th Aircraft Control and Warning Group), 1 June 1957 - 1 November 1959

Squadrons
 Interceptor Squadrons
 31st Fighter-Interceptor Squadron: 20 August 1957 – 8 October 1958
 64th Fighter-Interceptor Squadron: 13 April 1953 – 15 August 1957
 65th Fighter-Interceptor Squadron: 13 April 1953 – 1 November 1957
 66th Fighter-Interceptor Squadron: 13 April 1953 – 1 December 1957
 317th Fighter-Interceptor Squadron: 15 August 1957 – 25 August 1960

 Aircraft Control and Warning Squadrons

 625th Aircraft Control and Warning Squadron, 1 January 1950 - 1 November 1950
 626th Aircraft Control and Warning Squadron, 13 April 1953 - 1 June 1957, 1 November 1959 - 1 August 1960
 705th Aircraft Control and Warning Squadron, 13 April 1953 - 1 June 1957, 1 November 1959 - 1 August 1960
 709th Aircraft Control and Warning Squadron, c. 1 October 1955 - 1 November 1957
 712th Aircraft Control and Warning Squadron, c. 1 October 1955 - 1 November 1957
 713th Aircraft Control and Warning Squadron, 1 November 1959 - 1 August 1960
 714th Aircraft Control and Warning Squadron, 1 November 1959 - 1 August 1960
 717th Aircraft Control and Warning Squadron, 13 April 1953 - 1 June 1957, 1 November 1959 - 1 August 1960
 719th Aircraft Control and Warning Squadron, 13 April 1953 - 1 June 1957, 1 November 1959 - 1 August 1960
 720th Aircraft Control and Warning Squadron, 8 September 1955 - 1 June 1957, 1 November 1959 - 1 August 1960
 743d Aircraft Control and Warning Squadron, 1 October 1955 - 1 June 1957
 794th Aircraft Control and Warning Squadron, 8 September 1955 - 1 June 1957, 1 November 1959 - 1 August 1960
 795th Aircraft Control and Warning Squadron, 8 September 1955 - 1 June 1957, 1 November 1959 - 1 August 1960

 Other Squadrons
 5015 Radar Evaluation Flight, Electronic Counter Measures (later 5040 Radar Evaluation Flight, Electronic Counter Measures; 5070 Radar Evaluation Squadron (Target Electronic Counter Measures): 1 August 1957 – 1 August 1960.
 5039 Air Transport Squadron (later 5040 Operations Squadron): 1 June 1957 – 1 October 1957; 1 February 1959 – 1 August 1960

Stations
 Elmendorf Air Force Base, Alaska, 1 November 1950 – 27 April 1951
 Elmendorf Air Force Base, Alaska, 27 April 1951 – 20 June 1951
 Elmendorf Air Force Base, Alaska, 1 November 1952 – 25 August 1960

Commanders 

None (not manned), 1 November 1950–9 December 1950
Unknown, 10 December 1950 – 20 July 1951
Colonel Allen R. Springer, 1 November 1952
Colonel DeWitt S. Spain, July 1954
Brigadier General Dolf E. Muehleisen, August 1954
Colonel Donald W. Graham, July 1955
Colonel James R. Gunn Jr., c. August 1955
Colonel Louis E. Coira, 1 June 1957
Colonel John T. Shields, 22 October 1957
Colonel Jack A. Gibbs, 14 July 1959 – c.31 July 1960
Unknown, 1 August 1960–15 August 1960

Aircraft 

Lockheed F-80 Shooting Star, 1950–1951.
Lockheed F-94 Starfire, 1952–1954
Northrop F-89 Scorpion, 1953–1957
Convair F-102 Delta Dagger, 1957–1960
Fairchild C-119 Flying Boxcar, 1957
Fairchild C-123 Provider, 1957–1960
Martin RB-57 Canberra, c. 1957–1960
Boeing TB-29 Superfortress, 1957–1960
Douglas C-54 Skymaster, by 1959–1960
Piasecki H-21 Workhorse, by 1959–1960
 de Havilland Canada L-20 Beaver, by 1959–1960

See also 
 List of United States Air Force air divisions

References

Notes

Bibliography

010